Samrong Thap is a district (amphoe) in the eastern part of Surin province, northeastern Thailand.

History
The minor district (king amphoe) Samrong Thap was established on 1 September 1958. It was upgraded to a full district on 11 December 1959.

Geography
Neighboring districts are (from the southwest clockwise): Sikhoraphum, Sanom and Non Narai of Surin Province; Mueang Chan, Huai Thap Than and Prang Ku of Sisaket province.

Administration
The district is divided into 10 sub-districts (tambons), which are further subdivided into 100 villages (mubans). Samrong Thap is a township (thesaban tambon) which covers parts of tambons Samrong Thap and Nong Phai Lom. There are a further 10 tambon administrative organizations (TAO).

Notable people
Buakaw Banchamek – world-class kickboxer

Samrong Thap